Obstructing the field is one of the ten methods of dismissing a batsman in the sport of cricket. Either batsman can be given out if he wilfully attempts to obstruct or distract the fielding side by word or action. It is Law 37 of the Laws of cricket, and is a rare way for a batsman to be dismissed; in the history of cricket, there has been only one instance in Test matches, six occasions in One Day International (ODI) games, and only one instance in Twenty20 International matches. There have also been seven instances in Test cricket, and two in ODIs, where a batsman has been dismissed handled the ball, a mode of dismissal now folded into obstructing the field.

One modern pattern of obstruction in limited overs cricket occurs when a batsman thinks that he is going to be run out and blocks the ball with his bat, or changes his course while running between wickets to block the ball. The obstruction has to be deliberate.

The only time a batsman has been dismissed obstructing the field in a Test match was during the South African cricket team's tour of England in 1951 when, in the fifth Test, England's Len Hutton top edged the ball and, thinking the ball would hit the stumps, attempted to hit the ball away, thereby preventing the wicket-keeper from catching the ball.

Definition
Obstructing the field is Law 37 in the Laws of cricket established by the Marylebone Cricket Club (MCC). A batsman can be given out for obstructing the field if he wilfully attempts to obstruct or distract the fielding side by word or action.

Law 37 describes three specific circumstances where this applies, but the Law is not limited to these circumstances:
If, in the act of playing the ball, the batsmen wilfully strikes the ball with a hand not holding the bat, unless this is to avoid injury.
If either batsman should wilfully obstruct or distract a fielder preventing a catch being made.
If, at any time while the ball is in play and without the consent of a fielder, he uses his bat or any part of his person, to return the ball to any fielder.

In the second specific case, the striker is out, as it would have been him who could have been caught were it not for the obstruction. In any other case it is the batsman who obstructs who is out .

If a batsman deliberately alters his course whilst running, or interposes his bat, to block the path of a ball thrown at the stumps by a fielder, the umpire must decide whether the action is wilful. The umpire does not have to judge whether the fielding would have been likely to effect a Run out.

The bowler does not get credit for any obstruction dismissal. Any runs completed before the offence is committed are scored (unless the obstruction prevents a catch being made).

Returning the ball to a fielder
Traditionally, a batsman would ask the fielding team whether he might touch the ball before doing so, but even if he did not, if there were any goodwill between the teams, the fielding team would be unlikely to appeal, and unlikely to have their appeal confirmed by their captain, but the umpire would be obliged to give the batsman out if an appeal was made. Batsman were advised to ask to avoid the possibility of 'unpleasantness.' 

In the modern professional game the question is sensitive, as the fielding side may be trying to keep the ball dry and clean so that they may obtain reverse swing, and may well decline the batsman's offer to touch the ball.

Earliest recorded instance
The first known instance of a player being dismissed in a manner equivalent to the modern term 'Obstructing the field' occurred in a minor match at Sheffield on 27 August 1792, between Sheffield Cricket Club and Bents Green. The Bents Green player John Shaw, who scored 7 in the first innings, had his dismissal recorded as "run out of the ground to hinder a catch". The information was recorded by G. B. Buckley who found it in the Sheffield Advertiser dated 31 August 1792. Sheffield won by 10 wickets in a match that was notable for two other reasons, these being that it was the first match played in Yorkshire for which full scores are recorded and it was the earliest known instance of a three innings match.

Dismissals in international cricket

Test cricket
Len Hutton is the only man given out this way in Test cricket, for an incident that occurred at The Oval during the fifth Test of South Africa's tour of England in 1951.

One Day Internationals
In One Day Internationals, Rameez Raja (for Pakistan against England at Karachi in 1987) was given out for hitting the ball away with his bat to avoid being run out going for his century off the last ball of the innings, and Mohinder Amarnath (for India against Sri Lanka at Ahmedabad in 1989) was given out for kicking the ball away to avoid being run out. Another batsman to be given out this way is Inzamam-ul-Haq of Pakistan in the first ODI of India vs Pakistan Hutch Cup on 6 February 2006. After Inzamam drove the ball to mid off, Indian Suresh Raina threw it back to the striker's end, Inzamam stopping it with his bat. Umpire Simon Taufel gave him out as he was in the line of the stumps and out of his crease (and thus would have been run out had the ball hit the stumps).

Mohammad Hafeez of Pakistan was dismissed obstructing the field on 21 March 2013 in the 4th ODI of the bilateral series match against South Africa. He became the first man to be given out obstructing the field after the new playing conditions were introduced. His teammate, Anwar Ali, was dismissed obstructing the field on 27 November 2013 in the second ODI against South Africa.

Ben Stokes of England was dismissed obstructing the field on 5 September 2015 in the second ODI against Australia for stopping the ball with his hand when the bowler, Mitchell Starc, had thrown the ball in an attempt to run him out.

The complete list of batsmen given out obstructing the field in One Day Internationals is:

Women's One Day Internationals

T20 Internationals
On 23 June 2017, in a Twenty20 match against South Africa, Jason Roy of England was given out obstructing the field, for changing the side of the pitch he was running on when returning from backing up. This caused the returned ball to hit him when he was out of his crease, when it could conceivably have hit the stumps. The South African fielders immediately appealed for a dismissal. Responding to this, the on-field umpires called the ball dead and referred the decision to the third umpire, who gave Roy out.

The complete list of batsmen given out obstructing the field in Twenty20 Internationals is:

Women's T20 Internationals
Indian middle-order batter Anuja Patil was given out obstructing the field in the first innings of the final of the 2018 Women's Twenty20 Asia Cup against Bangladesh. She changed the course of her run en route to the non-striker's end while attempting a single.

Zimbabwean captain Mary-Ann Musonda was given out obstructing the field in the first innings of a game against Uganda during the 2022 Namibia Women's Tri-Nation Series in April 2022. She defended a ball from Janet Mbabazi which then rebounded towards her stumps, then gently hit the ball back to Mbabazi while remaining in her crease at all times.

Other recent instances
Mark Ramprakash was dismissed obstructing the field on 30 July 2011, in a County Championship Division 2 match between Surrey and Gloucestershire. Ramprakash was deemed to have deliberately tried to distract a fielder who was in the act of trying to run him out. He made no contact with the ball and it did not hit the stumps.

Yusuf Pathan of India was dismissed obstructing the field on 15 May 2013 while playing for the Kolkata Knight Riders against the Pune Warriors India in Match 65 of the 2013 Indian Premier League for deliberately kicking the ball while rotating the strike. He became the first player to be dismissed in T20 cricket in this fashion.

Sheldon Jackson was given out obstructing the field on 3 March 2017 during the 2016–17 Vijay Hazare Trophy match against Chhattisgarh. Jackson became only the second Indian batsman to be given out in a List A match in this manner.

Alex Ross of the Brisbane Heat was given out obstructing the field in a Big Bash League match against the Hobart Hurricanes in January 2018 for interfering with an attempted run out. It was the first time in Big Bash League history that a player was given out in this manner.

Ryan Burl was given out in a match in the 2017–18 Logan Cup by obstructing the field, after he pushed the ball away from the stumps to protect his wicket.

Amit Mishra was also dismissed for obstructing the field in the 2019 Indian Premier League Eliminator match against Sunrisers Hyderabad. He changed his line while Khaleel Ahmed was throwing the ball to prevent a run out, and was thus given out.

See also
 List of unusual dismissals in international cricket

Notes

References

Bibliography
 
 Wisden Cricketers' Almanack – various issues

External links
 The official laws of cricket

Cricket laws and regulations
Cricket terminology